Pulipadu is a village in Palnadu district of the Indian state of Andhra Pradesh. It is located in Gurazala mandal of Gurazala revenue division.

Geography 

Governance 

Pulipadu gram panchayat is the local self-government of the village.

Education 

As per the school information report for the academic year 2018–19, the village has 4 Zilla/Mandal Parishad schools.

References 

Villages in Palnadu district